Christophe Arend (born 12 August 1975) is a French politician of La République En Marche! (LREM) who has been serving as a member of the French National Assembly since the 2017 elections, representing the department of Moselle.

In parliament, Arend serves as member of the Committee on Sustainable Development and Spatial Planning. In addition to her committee assignments, he is part of the French-German Parliamentary Friendship Group.

In April 2018, Arend joined other co-signatories around Sébastien Nadot in officially filing a request for a commission of inquiry into the legality of French weapons sales to the Saudi-led coalition fighting in Yemen, days before an official visit of Saudi Crown Prince Mohammed bin Salman to Paris.

See also
 2017 French legislative election

References

1975 births
Living people
Deputies of the 15th National Assembly of the French Fifth Republic
La République En Marche! politicians